East Tawas is a city in Iosco County in the U.S. state of Michigan. The population was 2,663 at the 2020 census.

History
The western New York firm Smith, Van Valkenburg, & Company bought land in the area in order to exploit the area's lumber resources.  George Smith settled in the area in 1862 and founded the community.  The East Tawas post office opened on April 15, 1867.  A predecessor of the Detroit and Mackinac Railway built a station here, and the community incorporated as a village in 1887 and later as a city in 1895.  Tawas Beach was established nearby in 1903 along the railway line in Baldwin Township.  A post office opened here on June 12, 1903 until the community was annexed into the city of East Tawas in 1922.

Geography

Tawas Point State Park is located near East Tawas in Baldwin Township.

Climate

Major highways
 runs through the city.

Demographics

2010 census
As of the census of 2010, there were 2,808 people, 1,332 households, and 756 families residing in the city. The racial makeup of the city was 95.7% White, 0.2% African American, 0.3% Native American, 1.1% Asian, 0.1% Pacific Islander, 0.7% from other races, and 1.9% from two or more races. Hispanic or Latino of any race were 2.0% of the population.

There were 1,332 households, of which 21.4% had children under the age of 18 living with them, 42.6% were married couples living together, 10.1% had a female householder with no husband present, 4.1% had a male householder with no wife present, and 43.2% were non-families. 38.9% of all households were made up of individuals, and 20.4% had someone living alone who was 65 years of age or older. The average household size was 2.06 and the average family size was 2.70.

The median age in the city was 50.9 years. 18.6% of residents were under the age of 18; 5% were between the ages of 18 and 24; 17.7% were from 25 to 44; 31.2% were from 45 to 64; and 27.5% were 65 years of age or older. The gender makeup of the city was 45.2% male and 54.8% female.

2000 census
As of the census of 2000, there were 2,951 people, 1,382 households, and 815 families residing in the city. The racial makeup of the city was 97.80% White, 0.03% African American, 0.44% Native American, 0.44% Asian, 0.07% Pacific Islander, 0.10% from other races, and 1.12% from two or more races. Hispanic or Latino of any race were 0.75% of the population.

There were 1,382 households, out of which 23.7% had children under the age of 18 living with them, 47.1% were married couples living together, 9.1% had a female householder with no husband present, and 41.0% were non-families. 37.7% of all households were made up of individuals, and 23.0% had someone living alone who was 65 years of age or older.  The average household size was 2.14 and the average family size was 2.79.

In the city, the population was spread out, with 22.3% under the age of 18, 5.3% from 18 to 24, 23.3% from 25 to 44, 22.6% from 45 to 64, and 26.5% who were 65 years of age or older.  The median age was 44 years. For every 100 females, there were 82.8 males.  For every 100 females age 18 and over, there were 77.3 males.

The median income for a household in the city was $30,229, and the median income for a family was $40,313. Males had a median income of $30,375 versus $22,538 for females. The per capita income for the city was $17,168.  About 6.9% of families and 10.2% of the population were below the poverty line, including 13.2% of those under age 18 and 11.1% of those age 65 or over.

Education
The city is served by Tawas Area Schools.

Holy Family School is a private parochial elementary school in East Tawas serving approximately 80 students in grades K-6. It is affiliated with the Diocese of Gaylord of the Roman Catholic Church, and is a member of the National Catholic Educational Association.

References

External links

City of East Tawas official website

Cities in Iosco County, Michigan
Populated places on Lake Huron in the United States
Populated places established in 1862
1862 establishments in Michigan